Jean-Pierre Cayard is a French billionaire businessman, who inherited the spirits manufacturer La Martiniquaise from his father, turning it into France's second-largest spirits group.

As of May 2015, Cayard has an estimated net worth of US$3.2 billion.

References

Living people
French billionaires
Year of birth missing (living people)
Place of birth missing (living people)
21st-century French businesspeople